Kiranmala was an Indian Bengali language television series which aired on Star Jalsha from 4 August 2014 to 19 November 2016. It was produced by Surinder Films and starred Rukma Roy, Farhan Imroze and Chandrayee Ghosh. It was based on traditional folktales as collected in Thakurmar Jhuli by Dakshinaranjan Mitra Majumder. The series was dubbed into Tamil and aired on Star Vijay. An Odisha dubbed version is aired on Tarang TV.

Plot
The show depicts how the princess Kiranmala defeats the wicked demon queen Katkati and saves her kingdom Achinpur and Amrita Nagari and the whole of mankind. Bijoy, the king of Achinpur's wife, Rupmati gives birth to a child named Kiranmala. Katkati, Bijoy's other wife and Katkati's mother, Pyakati didn't like Kiranmala at all, fearing she might put an end to their reign. 18 years later, they start forming an entire team of demons including, Pishachini, Bajramala, Donkar and Bitkel. Kiranmala falls in love with Donkar's stepbrother Kumar Prithviraj making Donkar jealous of Prithviraj. And Bajramala becomes jealous of Kiranmala because Bajramala loves Prithviraj. However, Kiranmala and Prithviraj end up married. They give birth to Alokmala, who changes the jealousy in Bajramala and Donkar's heart into love. Katkati becomes angry and tries to destroy Achinpur and Amrita Nagari. Kiranmala suicides to save the world from Katkati. She and Katkati both go to Mokhsa (Kingdom of Death), where Kiranmala is rewarded with Svarga, while Katkati, Pyakati, Pishachini and Bitkel are left to suffer in Naraka.

Cast
 Rukma Roy as Rajkumari Kiranmala / Urmimala / Jhinukmala (Triple Role)
 Farhan Imroze as Rajkumar Prithviraj/Kumar
 Kaushik Chakraborty as Raja Bijoy : Kiranmala's father
 Aditi Chatterjee as Rani Rupmati: Kiranmala's mother
 Chandrayee Ghosh as Rakkoshi Rani Katkati/ Kotimaa
 Chaitali Chakraborty as Pyakati / Kotkoti's mother
 Rajni Gandhai as Alokmala/Hingting(Kiranmala's daughters)
 Arjun Chakraborty as Nakula
 Sonamana Arinsha as Sonamoni
 Moumita Gupta as Raj Mata / Kiranmala's grandmother
 Subhra Sourav Das as Donkar
 Ronit Modak as Bitkel
 Joymala Ganguly as Lalona

 Sumanta Mukherjee
 Mafin Chakraborty as Maya Pari / Maya Arshi
 Indradev Banerjee as Barun
 Chhanda K Chatterjee as Bodyi Buri 
 Anirban Bhattacharya as Kaal Tapaswi
 Riya Ganguly Chakraborty / Sayantani Guha Thakurata / Shreyasee Samanta as Shankhini / Chhalonamoyi, Kiranmala's sister a Naagini.
 Vivaan Ghoswami as Shuborno kumar
 Kanchana Moitra as Suroshini
 Madhubani Ghoshw as Bajramala / Kotkoti's daughter
 Debjani Chatterjee  as Maharani Amrapali: Kumar Prithviraj's mother
 Arijit Chakraborty as Maharaja Bikram Singha / Kumar Prithviraj's father
 Sayan Chakraborty as Alien

Reception
The serial was promoted by many film personalities from Tollywood like Koel Mallick and Raj Chakraborty in the last episode of the latter serial on August 3, 2014. The series had also become popular in neighboring Bangladesh, where several people have clashed over it at a village in the Habiganj District, injuring 100 people.

At the Kolkata Book Fair, seven children from Kolkata met Rukma Roy (who plays Kiranmala) at the stall of Star Jalsha.  The actress said:"Happy that the work of famed fantasy writer Dakshinaranjan Mitra Majumder will be introduced to the largely uninitiated audience of Gen Next as well as others. Replete with palace, forts and 'raj-durbar' Kiranmala by Star Jalsha will bring a change in the usual look of Bengali serials after many years."

Television special
A telefilm named Kiranmala has been premiered on STAR Jalsha on 15 March 2015 featuring June Malia as the queen of time.

References

External links
 Official Website on hotstar

2014 Indian television series debuts
Bengali-language television programming in India
2016 Indian television series endings
Indian fantasy television series
Indian supernatural television series
Indian drama television series
Television series based on books
Star Jalsha original programming
Television shows based on fairy tales